Qaleh-ye Pasi Jan (also Romanized as Qal‘eh-ye Pasī Jān and Qal‘eh-ye Pasījān; also known as Ghal‘eh Postjan, Qal‘eh Post Jān, Qal‘eh-ye Pastjān, and Qal‘eh-ye Post Jān) is a village in Qarah Kahriz Rural District, Qarah Kahriz District, Shazand County, Markazi Province, Iran. At the 2006 census, its population was 415, in 103 families.

References 

Populated places in Shazand County